In European Union member states, there exists a standard set of minimum landing sizes (MLS) for all major species of finfish and shellfish. These MLS are set under EU Council Regulation 850/98.

See also 
 List of harvested aquatic animals by weight

References

Fishing industry
European Union fishing regulations